Dario Toninelli (born 23 January 1992) is an Italian footballer. He plays for Pro Sesto.

Biography
Born in Milan, Lombardy, Toninelli played for A.C. Milan's Berretti under-18 team, losing to Atalanta in the finals of the wild card group. In August 2010 Toninelli left for Serie B club Varese on free transfer, losing to Roma in the final of the under-20 reserve league.

At the start of 2011–12 season, Toninelli left for Italian third division club Latina. After the club signed Lorenzo Burzigotti, Toninelli was moved to Bassano in temporary deal.

On 12 July 2012 Toninelli and Federico Furlan were signed by Bassano in co-ownership deal. In June 2013 the co-ownership were renewed. In June 2014 the co-ownership deal was renewed.

He started all 3 promotion playoffs for Bassano in 2014–15 season, including a penalty shootout against Reggiana in semi-finals. (as of semi-final match). On 25 July 2018, he extended his contract with Bassano until 2016.

In 2016, he was signed by Livorno.

On 23 August 2018, he signed with Serie D club Como. Following Como's promotion to Serie C, he signed a new 2-year contract with the club on 28 June 2019. For the 2021–22 season, Como was promoted to Serie B.

On 9 January 2022, Toninelli moved to Pro Sesto.

References

External links
 Football.it Profile 
 FIGC 
 

Italian footballers
Italy youth international footballers
A.C. Milan players
S.S.D. Varese Calcio players
Latina Calcio 1932 players
Bassano Virtus 55 S.T. players
U.S. Livorno 1915 players
Santarcangelo Calcio players
Como 1907 players
Pro Sesto 2013 players
Serie B players
Serie C players
Serie D players
Association football defenders
Footballers from Milan
1992 births
Living people